Travis Parrott and Filip Polášek were the defending champions; however, they didn't participate this year.
Santiago González and Horacio Zeballos won in the final 6–2, 7–6(5), against Franco Ferreiro and Júlio Silva.

Seeds

Draw

Draw

References
 Doubles Draw

San Luis Potosi Challenger - Doubles
2009 Doubles